CDX or CDx may stand for:

 Cdx, a gene family
 CDX Format in chemistry software
 Climate Data Exchange, software
 Community Development Exchange
 Companion diagnostic (Cdx)
 Council of Ten of the Venetian Republic
 Cyclodextrins or cycloamyloses, a family of oligosaccharides
 Sega CD-X, a video game console
 The Datel CDX cartridge
 The Numark CDX, a CD turntable
 The CDX Credit default swap index
 410 in Roman numerals
 An average graded sheet of exterior plywood
 Centre-right coalition, an alliance of political parties in Italy